The 1999–2000 UEFA Cup season was the 29th edition of the UEFA Cup competition. The final took place at Parken Stadium in Copenhagen and was won by Galatasaray, who defeated Arsenal in the final. The game was scoreless through the first ninety minutes and stayed that way through thirty minutes of extra time. The match went on to penalty kicks in which Gheorghe Popescu scored the winning goal to win the cup. Galatasaray won the cup without losing a single game. The competition was marred by violence involving Turkish and English hooligans in the semi-finals and the final, in particular the fatal stabbings of Leeds United fans Kevin Speight and Christopher Loftus by Galatasaray fans in Istanbul.

Parma were the defending champions, but were eliminated by Werder Bremen in the fourth round. They entered in the first round due to elimination in the third qualifying round of the UEFA Champions League.

It was the first season of the new format UEFA Cup; it had absorbed the now defunct Cup Winners' Cup to include domestic cup winners, and now featured an additional knockout round. This was the first year when the UEFA Cup winners qualified for the UEFA Super Cup. This season's champions also qualified for the 2001 FIFA Club World Championship, which was never held. So far, Galatasaray are the only UEFA Cup winners to qualify for a Club World Cup.

Association team allocation
A total of 142 teams from 49 UEFA associations participated in the 1999–2000 UEFA Cup. Associations are allocated places according to their 1999–2000 UEFA league coefficient.

Below is the qualification scheme for the 2000–01 UEFA Cup:
Associations 1–6 each enter three teams
Associations 7–8 each enter four teams
Associations 9–15 each enter two teams
Associations 16–21 each enter three teams
Associations 22–50 each enter two teams, with the exception of Bosnia who no enter teams, Liechtenstein and Andorra who enter one team each
3 winners of the Intertoto Cup
16 teams eliminated from the 1999–2000 UEFA Champions League third qualifying round are transferred to the UEFA Cup
8 teams eliminated from the 1999–2000 UEFA Champions League first group stage are transferred to the UEFA Cup

Association ranking

Notes
(UCL): Additional teams transferred from the UEFA Champions League
(IT): Additional teams from Intertoto Cup

Distribution

Redistribution rules
A UEFA Cup place is vacated when a team qualify for both the Champions League and the UEFA Cup, or qualify for the UEFA Cup by more than one method. When a place is vacated, it is redistributed within the national association by the following rules:
 When the domestic cup winners (considered as the "highest-placed" qualifier within the national association) also qualify for the Champions League, their UEFA Cup place is vacated, and the remaining UEFA Cup qualifiers are moved up one place, with the final place (with the earliest starting round) taken by the domestic cup runners-up, provided they do not already qualify for the Champions League or the UEFA Cup. Otherwise, UEFA forgot to establish a rule, so each association decided how to assign this place.
 When the domestic cup winners also qualify for the UEFA Cup through league position, their place through the league position is vacated, and the UEFA Cup qualifiers which finish lower in the league are moved up one place, with the final place taken by the highest-placed league finisher which do not qualify for the UEFA Cup yet.
 A place vacated by the League Cup winners is taken by the highest-placed league finisher which do not qualify for the UEFA Cup yet.
 A Fair Play place is taken by the highest-ranked team in the domestic Fair Play table which do not qualify for the Champions League or UEFA Cup yet.

Teams
The labels in the parentheses show how each team qualified for the place of its starting round:
 TH: Title holders
 CW: Cup winners
 CR: Cup runners-up
 LC: League Cup winners
 Nth: League position
 PO: End-of-season European competition play-off winners
 FP: Fair play
 IT: Intertoto Cup winners
 CL: Relegated from the Champions League
 GS: Third-placed teams from the group stage
 Q3: Losers from the third qualifying round

Notes

Qualifying round 

|}

First round 

|}

Second round 

|}

Third round 

|}

Fourth round 

|}

First leg

Second leg

Udinese 2–2 Slavia Prague on aggregate. Slavia Prague won on away goals rule.

Galatasaray won 2–0 on aggregate.

Mallorca won 4–2 on aggregate.

Werder Bremen won 3–2 on aggregate.

Leeds United won 1–0 on aggregate.

Arsenal won 6–3 on aggregate.

Celta Vigo won 4–1 on aggregate.

Lens won 6–4 on aggregate.

Quarter-finals 

|}

First leg

Second leg

Leeds United won 4–2 on aggregate.

Galatasaray won 6–2 on aggregate.

Arsenal won 6–2 on aggregate.

Lens won 2–1 on aggregate.

Semi-finals 

|}

First leg

Second leg

Arsenal won 3–1 on aggregate.

Galatasaray won 4–2 on aggregate.

Final

Top goalscorers

See also 
1999–2000 UEFA Champions League
1999 UEFA Intertoto Cup

References

External links 

1999–2000 All matches UEFA Cup – season at UEFA website
Official Site
Results at RSSSF.com
 All scorers 1999–2000 UEFA Cup according to (excluding preliminary round) according to protocols UEFA + all scorers preliminary round
1999/2000 UEFA Cup – results and line-ups (archive)

 
UEFA Cup seasons
2